The Logan Scorpions were an Australian rugby league football club from the suburb of Slacks Creek in Logan City, Queensland. Due to financial difficulties, the club ceased operation at the end of the 2002 Queensland Cup season, and merged with the Souths Magpies to form a new team, the Souths Logan Magpies.

History
The Scorpions made their debut in the third grade of the Brisbane Rugby League premiership (BRL) in 1987. After they made the grand final, which they lost to the Redcliffe Dolphins 4–18, it was decided to fully admit the club into first grade in 1988.

However, the Scorpions were never able to become competitive in the higher class of competition owing to financial difficulties not permitting them to recruit the best players available, a problem enhanced by the fact that all of the BRL's top talent had defected to the Brisbane Broncos or other Sydney-based NSWRL clubs. The Scorpions never made the semi-finals once in either the BRL First Grade or Queensland Cup; their most successful seasons being 1999 and 2000 when the club finished seventh out of twelve teams. They made the Brisbane A Grade grand final in 2000 but lost 10–28 to the Easts Tigers.

Logan's fortunes declined further in 2001 and 2002. In their final year they failed to win a single game in either the Queensland Cup or Brisbane A Grade, and suffered many huge losses, including losing 0–88 to the Redcliffe Dolphins at Dolphin Oval. At the completion of that season the football and leagues clubs were wound up, and a merger with the Souths Magpies to form the Souths Logan Magpies followed.

Notable players

Representative players for Queensland Residents
Paul Fisher
Shaun Ireland
Brendon Lindsay
Brad Pike
Shane Perry
Carl Turner
Alan Lowe

Other notable players 
 Gary O‘Brien
 Brian Hegarty
 Brian Armstrong
 Michael Devlin
 Bernie Finch
 Aaron Stewart
 Billy Dart
 Alan Hughes
 Mal Hughes
 Dougie Hughes
 Paul Bartier
 Glen Haggath
 Sean Roberts
 Stephen Royston
 Matt Burgess (1996–98)
 Clinton Davis (1996–99)
 Martin Moloney (1996–99)
 Andrew Thompson
 David Pitt
 Taureon Ruston (2002)Taureon finished his rugby playing career in a largely uninspiring stint with The Duds (TRL Mackay)

International representatives
 Sam Backo

Greg Chappell 1995 2002

References

External links
 Logan Scorpions Statistics (archived). Originally retrieved 7 December 2005

Logan City
Rugby clubs established in 1987
Rugby clubs disestablished in 2002
Defunct rugby league teams in Australia
1987 establishments in Australia
Rugby league teams in Brisbane